John Forrest "Fuzzy" Knight (May 9, 1901 – February 23, 1976) was an American film and television actor. He was also a singer, especially in his early career. He appeared in more than 180 films between 1928 and 1967, usually as a cowboy hero's comic sidekick.

Biography
Knight was born in Fairmont, West Virginia, the third child and son of James A. and Olive Knight. In Fairmont, he worked as a clerk at a hotel and played in a theater orchestra.

He attended nearby West Virginia University where he was a member of Sigma Nu fraternity, a cheerleader and law student. He wrote a pep song, "Fight Mountaineers," which is still frequently used by the Mountaineer Marching Band 90 years later. He also wrote the melody for a WVU song titled "To Thee Our Alma Mater," with words by fellow graduate David A. Christopher. He formed his own band in college and played drums, eventually leaving school to perform in vaudeville and in big bands such as Irving Aaronson's and George Olsen's.

Eventually his musical and comedy skills took him to New York, where he appeared in Earl Carroll's Vanities of 1927 and on Broadway in Here's Howe and Ned Wayburn's Gambols.  He was billed under his nickname, Fuzzy (given him because of his peculiarly soft voice).

While touring with bands, Knight came to Hollywood and appeared in several musical short films for MGM and Paramount between 1928 and 1932. Mae West gave him his first notable film role in She Done Him Wrong, and he went on to play in many dozens of films over the next 30 years.  By the 1940s, he was primarily playing in Western movies and was voted one of the Top Ten Money-Making Stars in Westerns in 1940.

Knight became famous to a new generation when he co-starred as Buster Crabbe's sidekick (using his own name as Private Fuzzy Knight) on the 1955 television series Captain Gallant of the Foreign Legion. In semi-retirement thereafter, Knight continued to make occasional appearances in films and TV shows through 1967.

He died in his sleep at the Motion Picture Country House and Hospital in Woodland Hills, California, and was survived by his wife, actress Patricia Ryan (née Thelma de Long). He was buried in Valhalla Memorial Park Cemetery in Burbank, California.

Filmography

References

External links

Fuzzy Knight and His Little Piano film short from YouTube

1901 births
1976 deaths
20th-century American male actors
20th-century American musicians
Male actors from West Virginia
American male film actors
Songwriters from West Virginia
American male television actors
Burials at Valhalla Memorial Park Cemetery
West Virginia University alumni
Male Western (genre) film actors
People from Fairmont, West Virginia